South African singer Amanda Black has released three studio albums, eleven singles (including six as a featured artist) and seven music videos (including three as a featured artist). She achieved recognition in 2016 following the release of her hit single "Amazulu", which was nominated for several music awards. Her debut studio album Amazulu was certified platinum three weeks after its official release. Black's music has been released through record labels Ambitiouz Entertainment, Sony Music, and her own label AfroRockstar.

Albums

Studio albums

Singles

As lead artist

As featured artist

Guest appearances

Music videos

As lead artist

As featured artist

References 

Discographies of South African artists
Amanda Black songs
Amanda Black albums